npj 2D Materials and Applications, is an open access peer-reviewed scientific journal published by Nature Publishing Group. It focuses on 2D materials (such as thin films), including fundamental behaviour, synthesis, properties and applications.

According to the Journal Citation Reports, npj 2D Materials and Applications has a 2020 impact factor of 11.106. The current editor-in-chief is Andras Kis (École Polytechnique Fédérale de Lausanne).

Scope 
npj 2D Materials and Applications publishes articles, brief communication, comment, matters arising, perspective, and editorial on 2D materials in their entirety, including fundamental behaviour, synthesis, properties and applications. Specific materials of interest will include, but are not limited to:
2D materials in all their forms: graphene, transition metal dichalcogenides, phosphorene and molecular systems, including relevant allotropes and compounds, and topological materials
fundamental understanding of their basic science
synthesis by physical and chemical approaches
behavior and properties: electronic, magnetic, spintronic, photonic, mechanical, including in heterostructures and other architectures
applications: sensors, memory, high-frequency electronics, energy harvesting and storage, flexible electronics, water treatment, biomedical, thermal management.

References

External links
 

Nature Research academic journals
Materials science journals
English-language journals